Zoarces gillii is an eelpout in the family Zoarcidae, found between Japan and eastern Korea, mainly in the Yellow Sea.

References

External links
 Zoarces gillii at Encyclopedia of Life.

gillii
Fish described in 1905
Viviparous fish
Fish of the Pacific Ocean
Fish of Asia
Fish of Japan
Taxa named by David Starr Jordan